Racism in Canada traces both historical and contemporary racist community attitudes, as well as governmental negligence and political non-compliance with United Nations human rights standards and incidents in Canada. Contemporary Canada is the product of indigenous First Nations combined with multiple waves of immigration, predominantly from Europe and in contemporary times, from Asia.

Overview
In a 2013 survey of 80 countries by the World Values Survey, Canada was ranked among the most racially tolerant societies in the world. In 2021, the Social Progress Index ranked Canada 6th in the world for overall tolerance and inclusion.

Canadian author and journalist Terry Glavin claims that white Canadians consider themselves to be mostly free of racial prejudice, perceiving the country to be a "more inclusive society" than its direct neighbor the United States, a notion that has come under criticism. For instance, Galvin cites the treatment of the Aboriginal population in Canada as evidence of Canada's own racist tendencies. These perceptions of inclusion and "colour-blindness" have also been challenged in recent years by scholars such as Constance Backhouse stating that white supremacy is still prevalent in the country's legal system, with blatant racism created and enforced through the law. According to one commentator, Canadian "racism contributes to a self-perpetuating cycle of criminalization and imprisonment". In addition, throughout Canada's history there have been laws and regulations that have negatively affected a wide variety of races, religions, and groups of persons.

Canadian law uses the term "visible minority" to refer to people of colour (but not aboriginal Canadians), introduced by the Employment Equity Act of 1995. However, the UN Committee on the Elimination of Racial Discrimination stated this term may be considered objectionable by certain minorities and recommended an evaluation of this term.

In 2019, the English and Art departments at Kwantlen Polytechnic University collaborated to put on an exhibition called Maple-Washing: A Disruption, which featured various works examining Canadian history from diverse perspectives. With "Maple-Washing" (portmanteau of maple and "whitewash") referring to the alleged tendency of Canadian institutions to sanitize Canadian history. Historical topics and events covered in the exhibition included Canadian participation in the trans-Atlantic slave trade, the Komagata Maru incident, the internment of Japanese Canadians during World War Two, and the Chinese head tax, frequently "maple-washed" incidents.

Examples

Indigenous Peoples 

Canada's treatment of First Nations people is governed by the Indian Act. The Canadian Indian Act helped inspire South Africa's apartheid policies.
Many Indigenous people were forced into assimilation through the Canadian Indian residential school system. From 1928 to the mid-1990s, Indigenous girls in the residential school system were subject to forced sterilization once they reached puberty. The number of sterilized girls is not known because the records were destroyed. European colonizers assumed the Indigenous peoples needed saving, a form of "charitable racism".  However, this attitude is not absent from modern Canada, for example, in August 2008, McGill University's Chancellor and International Olympic Committee representative Richard Pound told La Presse: "We must not forget that 400 years ago, Canada was a land of savages, with scarcely 10,000 inhabitants of European origin, while in China, we're talking about a 5,000-year-old civilization", implying that the First Nations people were "uncivilized".

In 1999 the Canadian government created an autonomous territory, Nunavut, for the Inuit living in the Arctic and northernmost parts of the country. The Inuit compose 85% of the population of Nunavut, which represents a new level of self-determination for the Indigenous peoples of Canada.

Slavery of Aboriginals and Black Canadians 

There are records of slavery in some areas of British North America, which later became Canada, dating from the 17th century. The majority of these slaves were Aboriginal, and United Empire Loyalists brought slaves with them after leaving the United States. Marie-Joseph Angélique was one of New France's best-known slaves. While pregnant, she set her mistress' house on fire for revenge or to divert the attention away from her escape. She ran away with the father of her child, who was also a black slave and belonged to another owner. The fire that she started ended up burning part of Montreal and a large portion of the Hôtel-Dieu. Later on, she was caught and sentenced to death.

Segregation and Ku Klux Klan
Canada had also practiced segregation, and a Canadian Ku Klux Klan exists. Racial profiling occurs in cities such as Halifax, Toronto and Montreal. Black people made up 3% of the Canadian population in 2016, and 9% of the population of Toronto (which has the largest communities of Caribbean and African immigrants). They lived disproportionately in poverty, were three times as likely to be carded in Toronto than Whites, and incarceration rates for Blacks were climbing faster than for any other demographic. A Black Lives Matter protest was staged at Toronto Police Headquarters in March 2016.

Order-in-Council P.C. 1911-1324 

On August 12, 1911, the Governor General in Council approved a one-year prohibition of black immigration to Canada because, according to the Order-in-Council, "the Negro race" was "unsuitable to the climate and requirements of Canada." It was tabled on June 2, 1911, by the Minister of the Interior, Frank Oliver, following mounting pressure from white prairie farmers who were discontented with an influx in the immigration of black farmers from the United States. It was never officially enforced or added to the Immigration Act, likely because the government—led by Prime Minister Wilfrid Laurier—was hesitant to alienate black voters ahead of the 1911 federal election. It was repealed later that year.

Africville

In Nova Scotia, a community which mainly consisted of Black Canadians were forcibly removed and eventually razed between 1964 and 1967 after years of intentional neglect by the government in Halifax.

Greek-Canadians

The 1918 Toronto anti-Greek riot was a three-day race riot in Toronto, Ontario, Canada, targeting Greek immigrants during August 2–4, 1918. It was the largest riot in the city's history and one of the largest anti-Greek riots in the world.

Jews 

Jewish students were prohibited from studying at Canadian universities. Canada had restrictive policies towards Jewish immigration. In 1939, Jewish refugees escaping from WWII Europe aboard the MS St Louis were not allowed to enter Canada due to racist immigration policies.

While government policies have changed, antisemitism remains problematic. Jews are a tiny-and therefore more vulnerable-minority in Canada, comprising only 1.1% of the population, in 2018. Partially due to the small size of the community, hate crimes against Jews (also referred to as "violent antisemitism") is the highest per-capita form of race-based violence reported in Canada.

Romani people

Asian Canadians

Indo-Canadians 

In 1914, Indians arriving in Canada were not allowed to enter despite being British subjects, leading to the deaths of dozens of immigrants in the Komagata Maru incident.

Chinese Canadians 

Starting in 1858, Chinese "coolies" were brought to Canada to work in British Columbia in the mines and on the Canadian Pacific Railway.  After anti-Chinese riots broke out in 1886, a "Chinese head tax" was implemented to curtail immigration from China.  In 1907, the Anti-Oriental Riots in Vancouver targeted Chinese and Japanese-owned businesses, and the Asiatic Exclusion League was formed to drive Asians out of the province. League members attacked Asians, resulting in numerous riots. In 1923, the federal government passed the Chinese Immigration Act, commonly known as the Exclusion Act, prohibiting most Chinese immigration.  The Act was repealed in 1947, but discrimination limiting non-European immigrants continued until 1967 when a points-based system was introduced to assess immigrants regardless of origin.

Japanese Canadians 

Although a British–Japanese treaty guaranteed Japanese citizens freedom of travel, they were nevertheless subject to anti-Asian racism in Canada, though a slightly lesser degree at the time than the Chinese before World War II, as an informal agreement between the Japanese and Canadian governments limited Japanese immigration in the wake of the Vancouver anti-Asian riots.

In 1942, during World War II, many Canadians of Japanese heritage—even those born in Canada— were forcibly moved to internment camps under the authority of the War Measures Act. At first, many men were separated from their families and sent to road camps in Ontario and on the British Columbia–Alberta border. Small towns in the BC interior such as Greenwood, Sandon, New Denver and Slocan became internment camps for women, children and the aged. To stay together, Japanese–Canadian families chose to work in farms in Alberta and Manitoba. Those who resisted and challenged the orders of the Canadian government were rounded up by the Royal Canadian Mounted Police and incarcerated in a barbed-wire prisoner-of-war camp in Angler, Ontario. Japanese–Canadians fishing boats were also seized, with plans to drastically reduce fishing licenses from them and forcibly redistribute them for white Canadians. With government promises to return the land and properties seized during that time period, Japanese Canadians left their homes. This turned out to be untrue, as the seized possessions were resold and never returned to the Japanese Canadians. Unlike prisoners of war, who were protected by the Geneva Convention, Japanese–Canadians were forced to pay for their own internment.

COVID-19 pandemic
In the midst of the COVID-19 pandemic, Asian Canadians reported increased incidents of violent assaults, especially against women of Asian descent. According to an Angus Reid survey from 22 June 2020, up to 50% of Chinese-Canadians had experienced verbal abuse, and 29% had been made to feel feared, as if they posed a threat to public safety. Another survey of 1,600 adults conducted by ResearchCo and obtained by the Agence France-Presse revealed one in four Canadians of Asian descent (70% of whom were of Chinese descent) who lived in British Columbia knew someone within their household who had faced discrimination. The survey also revealed 24 percent of Canadians of South Asian descent reported racist insults. Canadians of Indigenous origin had also reported discrimination.

Missing and murdered Indigenous women

The representation of murdered Indigenous women in crime statistics is not proportionate to the general population. In 2006, Amnesty International researched racism specific to Indigenous women in Canada. They reported on the lack of basic human rights, discrimination, and violence against Indigenous women. The Amnesty report found that First Nations women (age 25–44) with status under the Indian Act were five times more likely than other women of the same age to die as a result of violence. In 2006, the documentary film Finding Dawn looked into the many missing and murdered Aboriginal women in Canada over the past three decades.
In September 2016, in response to repeated calls from Indigenous groups, activists, and non-governmental organizations, the Government of Canada under Prime Minister Justin Trudeau, jointly with all provincial and territorial governments, established a national public inquiry into Missing and Murdered Indigenous Women and Girls.

Indigenous people still have to deal with racism within Canada and the challenges that the communities face are often ignored. There are still negative stereotypes associated with Indigenous people such as being freeloaders, drug addicts or dumb. Indigenous people are more likely to feel depression due to several factors such as poverty, loss of cultural identity, inadequate health care and more.

In 2020, the staff at a hospital in the Quebec city of Joliette were shown on video mocking and making racist remarks at an Atikamekw woman who eventually died. Indigenous leaders say the video exposes the grim realities of systemic racism that have long gone ignored or suppressed throughout Canada.

See also 

Aboriginal land title in Canada
Act of Union 1840
Africville
AmINext
Anna Mae Aquash
Anti-Quebec sentiment
Burning of the Parliament Buildings in Montreal
Canadian Aboriginal law
Canadian Indian residential school system
Chinese head tax in Canada
Compulsory sterilization in Canada
Continuous journey regulation
COVID-19 racism
Death of Regis Korchinski-Paquet
Death of Tina Fontaine
Fascism in Canada
High Arctic relocation
Highway of Tears murders
Indian Health Transfer Policy (Canada)
Indigenous food security in Canada
Indigenous land claims in Canada
Indigenous Peoples and the Canadian Criminal Justice System
Indigenous specific land claims in Canada
Missing and murdered Indigenous women
Montreal experiments
MV Sun Sea incident
 Nativism (politics)#Canada
Numbered Treaties
October Crisis
One Dead Indian
Order-in-Council P.C. 1911-1324
Quebec City mosque shooting
Racial separate schools (Canada)
Redwashing
Regulation 17
Saskatoon freezing deaths ("Starlight tours")
Seton Portage
Status of First Nations treaties in British Columbia
Stereotypes of Indigenous peoples of Canada and the United States
The Canadian Crown and Aboriginal peoples
The Potlatch Ban
Ukrainian Canadian internment
Vancouver anti-Asian riots
2010–2017 Toronto serial homicides

References

 
Human rights in Canada
Human rights abuses in Canada
Violence against Indigenous people in Canada
C
Canada